Emma Straub is an American novelist and bookstore owner. Her novels include Modern Lovers, The Vacationers, Laura Lamont’s Life in Pictures and All Adults Here. She is the author of a short story collection entitled Other People We Married. In May 2022, Straub's novel This Time Tomorrow was published by Riverhead Books.

Personal life
Straub is the daughter of horror and suspense writer Peter Straub. She is married to Michael Fusco-Straub, a graphic designer, with whom she has two sons. A graduate of The Cathedral School of St. John the Divine, Saint Ann's School, Oberlin College, and the University of Wisconsin–Madison, she lives in Brooklyn and owns the book store Books Are Magic.

Controversy
During the month of January 2023, author Emma Straub had two book events canceled in Texas schools, after her usage of profanity on social media was discovered.

Works

References

External links
 

Year of birth missing (living people)
Living people
Novelists from New York (state)
21st-century American women writers
21st-century American novelists
American women novelists
Saint Ann's School (Brooklyn) alumni
Oberlin College alumni
University of Wisconsin–Madison alumni
People from Brooklyn
Writers from New York City